The following is a list of events, births, and deaths in 1937 in Switzerland.

Incumbents
Federal Council:
Giuseppe Motta 
Hermann Obrecht
Philipp Etter
Johannes Baumann (President)
Marcel Pilet-Golaz 
Albert Meyer 
Rudolf Minger

Tournaments
1936–37 Nationalliga, won by FC Lugano
1937 Swiss Grand Prix, won by Rudolf Caracciola
1937–38 Nationalliga, won by Grasshopper Club Zürich

Establishments

Events by month

January

February

March

April

May

June

July

August

September
Nyon Conference, which addresses attacks on shipping in the Spanish Civil War

October

November

December

Other
Kleine Scheidegg, a Swiss drama, is published
An Answer from the Silence, a novel by Max Frisch, is published in Swiss
Allianz, a group of Swiss artists, is founded

Births
Attilio Moresi, a cyclist
Sandro del Prete, a painter
February 3 – Billy Meier, prophet
February 24 – Art Furrer, a restaurateur
March 9 – Niele Toroni, a painter
18 May – Peter Bolliger, a rower
21 May – Hansjörg Hirschbühl, a bobsleigher
June 2 – Pierre Favre, a musician
June 30 – Fritz Egli, a motorcycle racer
July 6 – Joseph Payne, a musician
July 12 – Fritz Kehl, a Swiss football (association football) defender
December 21– Hansruedi Führer, a football (association football) defender

Deaths
April 7– Hans Steffen, a German geographer who died in Switzerland
9 May – Walter Mittelholzer, a pilot, photographer, and travel writer
2 September – Pierre de Coubertin, French historian and founder of the International Olympic Committee

References

 
1937 in Swiss sport
1937 in Europe
Years of the 20th century in Switzerland